Francis David Charles Napier, 15th Lord Napier and 6th Baron Ettrick (born 3 November 1962), is a Scottish nobleman, the hereditary chief of the Clan Napier. He is the son of Nigel Napier, 14th Lord Napier, and Delia Mary Pearson, daughter of Major Archibald David Barclay Pearson.

Lord Napier was educated at Stanbridge Earls School and at the Otley College of Agriculture and Horticulture.

On the death of his father in 2012 Napier succeeded him as Lord Napier and Ettrick, and Baronet of Nova Scotia.  He has not, however, formally proved his succession to the latter title.

In 1993 he married Zara Jane McCalmont, only daughter of Hugh Dermot McCalmont. They have two children:

 Hon. William Alexander Hugh Napier, Master of Napier (10 June 1996 – 27 August 2021)
 Hon. Sophie Eleanor Rose Napier, Mistress of Napier (born 24 May 1999), heir presumptive to the lordship.

Sources 

1962 births
Francis
People educated at Stanbridge Earls School
Place of birth missing (living people)
Living people
Lords Napier
Eldest sons of British hereditary barons